The 926th Aircraft Control and Warning Squadron is an inactive United States Air Force unit. It was last assigned to the Goose Air Defense Sector, Air Defense Command, stationed at Frobisher Bay Air Base, Northwest Territories, Canada. It was inactivated on 1 November 1961.

The unit was a General Surveillance Radar squadron providing for the air defense of North America.

Lineage
 Activated as  926th Aircraft Control and Warning Squadron, 13 June 1953
 Inactivated 1 November 1961

Assignments
 4707th Air Defense Wing, 13 June 1953
 64th Air Division (NEAC), 1 October 1953
 4733d Air Defense Group (ADC), 1 April 1957
 4732d Air Defense Group, 1 May 1958
 Goose Air Defense Sector, 1 April 1960 – 1 November 1961

Stations
 Grenier AFB, New Hampshire, 13 June 1953
 Frobisher Bay AB, Northern Territories, 1 October 1953 – 1 November 1961

References

  A Handbook of Aerospace Defense Organization 1946 - 1980,  by Lloyd H. Cornett and Mildred W. Johnson, Office of History, Aerospace Defense Center, Peterson Air Force Base, Colorado

External links

Radar squadrons of the United States Air Force
Aerospace Defense Command units
1953 establishments in New Hampshire
1961 disestablishments in Canada